Conservatives for Britain is a Eurosceptic political pressure group within the Conservative Party of the United Kingdom.

The group's co chairmen are David Campbell Bannerman, a Conservative member of the European Parliament who had previously served as deputy leader of the UK Independence Party, and Steve Baker, a backbench Conservative member of parliament at Westminster. Other leaders include Nigel Lawson, the group's president, and Norman Lamont, both former cabinet ministers now in the House of Lords.

Formation
The group was founded early in June 2015, shortly after the dust had settled on the British general election held on 7 May.

On 8 October 2015, Conservatives for Britain announced its support for the Vote Leave campaign in the referendum on British membership of the EU, stressing in a statement the importance of establishing "a professional, mainstream cross party campaign that can fight the referendum if the EU fails to allow fundamental change".

The Daily Telegraph reported on the new group's formation under the heading "50 Tories plot Britain's EU exit". The Guardian greeted it with the headline "Meet the new 'bastards' – the Tories' fifty strong awkward squad", referring to a famous outburst by John Major in the 1990s.

On 11 June, Campbell Bannerman was reported as predicting that most Tory members of the European Parliament would join the group, but he stressed that it was not at that point an "Out" campaign.

Aims
In January 2016, the group's co chairman in the parliamentary Conservative party was Steve Baker, who described the group thus:

Supporters

President
Nigel Lawson
Vice Presidents
Steve Bell
Lord Blencathra
Bill Cash MP
Howard Flight
Lord Forsyth
Liam Fox MP
Lord Hamilton

Daniel Hannan MEP
Lord Howard of Rising
Sir Gerald Howarth MP
Bernard Jenkin MP
David Jones MP
Norman Lamont, Lord Lamont
Julian Lewis
Michael Ancram, Marquess of Lothian
Emma McClarkin

Sir John Nott
Owen Paterson MP
John Redwood MP
Viscount Ridley
Lord Tebbit
Co Chairmen
Steve Baker MP
David Campbell Bannerman MEP

See also
Business for Britain
Campaign for an Independent Britain
Democracy Movement
Grassroots Out (GO)
Labour Leave
Leave Means Leave
Leave.EU
Vote Leave

References

External links
 conservativesforbritain.org (official website)

Euroscepticism in the United Kingdom
Organisations associated with the Conservative Party (UK)
2016 United Kingdom European Union membership referendum
Organizations established in 2015
2015 establishments in the United Kingdom
Brexit–related advocacy groups in the United Kingdom